Klammljoch (el. 2288 m.) is a high mountain pass in the Alps on the border between Austria and Italy.

It connects the Austrian state of Tyrol with the Italian province of South Tyrol, being located between Sankt Jakob in Defereggen and Sand in Taufers. The steep gravel road over the pass is closed to motorized vehicles, but it can be traversed by bicycle.

See also
 List of highest paved roads in Europe
 List of mountain passes

External links 

Mountain passes of the Alps
Mountain passes of Tyrol (state)
Mountain passes of South Tyrol
Austria–Italy border crossings